Right Hand Man is the seventh studio album by American country music singer Eddy Raven. It was released in 1986 by RCA Nashville.

Content and reception
Four singles from the album made the Hot Country Songs charts: "Sometimes a Lady", the title track, "You're Never Too Old for Young Love", and "Shine, Shine, Shine", the last of which made it to the number 1 position on that chart in 1987.

Alanna Nash wrote in Stereo Review that the album seemed to focus more on Raven's singing over his songwriting, noting that the album had more of a country pop sound than its predecessors.

Track listing

Personnel
Eddie Bayers - drums
Barry Beckett - piano
Dennis Burnside - keyboards, synthesizer
Don Gant - background vocals
Jim Horn - saxophone
Mike Lawler - keyboards, synthesizer
Frank J. Myers - acoustic guitar
Joe Osborn - bass guitar
Eddy Raven - lead vocals
Bergen White - background vocals
Dennis Wilson - background vocals
Paul Worley - acoustic guitar
Reggie Young - electric guitar

Chart performance

References

1986 albums
RCA Records albums
Eddy Raven albums
Albums produced by Don Gant